Topsy Chapman (1947–2022) was a Jazz and Gospel musician from New Orleans, Louisiana.

Early life 
Chapman was born in Kentwood, Louisiana. She sang and played piano at the age of 3 and was considered a musical prodigy. By the age of 6 or 7, she was earning money performing in churches.

Career 
Chapman moved to New Orleans when she was 17 where she led her family's Gospel group, The Chapmans. Playwright and director, Vernel Bagneris, recruited the group to appear in his production on 'One Mo' Time'. The show ran at Toulouse Theatre and later premiered Off-Broadway.

Chapman performed with her daughters, Yolanda Robinson and Jolynda Phillips, under the group name Topsy Chapman and Solid Harmony.

Chapman often performed at New Orleans Jazz Fest and well known in the New Orleans music scene.

Death 
Chapman died in 2022.

References

External links 
 American Routes Podcast, episodes featuring Topsy Chapman

1947 births
2022 deaths
American jazz singers
American gospel singers
Musicians from New Orleans